Paul Dourish (born 1966) is a computer scientist best known for his work and research at the intersection of computer science and social science. Born in Scotland, he holds the Steckler Endowed Chair of Information and Computer Science  at the University of California, Irvine, where he joined the faculty in 2000,
and where he directs the Steckler Center for Responsible, Ethical, and
Accessible Technology.
He is a Fellow of the AAAS,
the ACM, and
the British Computer Society, and is a two-time winner of the ACM 
CSCW "Lasting Impact" award, in 2016 and 2021.

Dourish has published three books and over 100 scientific articles, and holds 19 US patents.

Life 
Born and raised in Glasgow, Scotland, Dourish studied at St Aloysius' College. He then received a B.Sc. in Artificial Intelligence and Computer Science from the University of Edinburgh in 1989. He moved to work at Rank Xerox EuroPARC (later the Xerox Research Center Europe) in Cambridge, UK, during which time he completed a Ph.D. in Computer Science at University College London (UCL).

After completing his Ph.D, he moved to California, working for Apple Computer in Cupertino, California. He worked in research laboratories at Apple Computer until they closed 10 months later and then at Xerox's Palo Alto Research Center.

In 2000, Dourish moved to Southern California, when he joined the faculty at the University of California, Irvine. Since then, he has remained a full professor of Informatics. He has held visiting positions at Intel, Microsoft, Stanford University, MIT, the IT University of Copenhagen, and the University of Melbourne.

Work 

His published work is primarily in the areas of Human-Computer Interaction, Computer supported cooperative work, and Ubiquitous computing. He is the author of over 100 scientific publications, and holds 19 US patents. He is amongst the most prolific and widely cited scholars in Human-Computer Interaction; Microsoft's academic search system lists him as the fourth most influential author in the area while Google Scholar calculates his h-index at over 50.

His research tends to draw both on technical and social domains, and speak to the relationship between them. His research topics have included the role of informal awareness in supporting coordination in collaborative systems, the relationship between 'place' and 'space' in information systems, and
methodological questions about the use of ethnographic techniques in information systems design.

At UC Irvine, he is a teaching professor of Informatics in the Donald Bren School of Information and Computer Sciences department, where he is a member of the Laboratory for Ubiquitous Computing and Interaction (LUCI), and in the interdisciplinary graduate program in Arts Computation Engineering. In addition to his appointment in Informatics, he has courtesy appointments in Computer Science and Anthropology. From 2004–2006, he was Associate Director at the
California Institute for Telecommunications and Information Technology.

He co-directs the Center for Social Computing, one of Intel Corporation's US science and technology centers. Based at UC Irvine, this center involves academic partners from NYU, Cornell, Georgia Tech, and Indiana University.

At UC Irvine, Dourish is also a member of:
The divisional council of the California Institute for Telecommunications and Information Technology
The Center for Cyber-Security and Privacy
The Institute for Software Research
The Center for Organizational Research
The Center for Computer Games and Virtual Worlds
The Center for Unconventional Security Affairs
The Center for Biomedical Informatics
The advisory board of the Center for Ethnography and the Institute for Money, Technology, and Financial Inclusion
The executive board of the UC-wide Pacific Rim Research Program

Along with being a member of the aforementioned organizations, Dourish is a "co-conspirator" in the Laboratory for Ubiquitous Computing and Interaction, a faculty associate of the Center for Research on Information Technology and Organizations, and a co-coordinator of the People and Practices PAPR@UCI initiative.

Awards 

In 2008, he was elected to the CHI Academy in recognition of his contributions to Human-Computer Interaction. Dourish won the Diana Forsythe Prize in 2002, and the BM Faculty Award in 2006 under the American Medical Informatics Association. He was also awarded the National Science Foundation CAREER Award in 2002. Dourish recently received a $201,000 grant to conduct research on people's online participation in social movements. Dourish recently received a $400,000 grant to research how the creative design process works when a team is split up through different cultures. Dourish also recently received a $247,000 grant to research how social media ties into death in real life.

In 2015 he was named a fellow of the Association for Computing Machinery "for contributions in social computing and human-computer interaction."

Research 
Dourish mainly performs research in three specific areas of human-computer interaction (HCI). This includes work under ubiquitous computing (ubicomp), computer-supported cooperative work (CSCW), and Social Studies of Science and Technology. Dourish combines this technical research with sociology, anthropology, and cultural studies in an effort that he calls "embodied interaction."

One of Dourish's most recognized contributions has been bringing sociological and phenomenological understandings of human activity to the design of technological systems. For example, his work on spatiality in virtual worlds and computer mediated communication has emphasized how people—in interaction with systems and with one another—evolve new understandings of space, media, and relationships. He also drew on Schutzian phenomenology to argue that tangible computing and social computing share an underlying emphasis on people as embodied, social actors. Emphasizing people as social and embodied points to the importance of how individuals are constituted through their interactions and movements in space with other people. This model is counterposed to models of the person in Human-Computer Interaction that focus exclusively on people's cognitive capabilities.

Previous projects that Dourish has worked on include studies of privacy and spatiality. In this first study, Dourish emphasized privacy as "something that people do rather than something that people have". He was interested in how people rate information and activities based on privacy and risk. Through the studies, he sought knowledge of private practice as a social phenomenon. His second study involved the impact on shaping spatiality by information technologies. His goal was to study spatiality as a social and cultural production.

Dourish's recent work has dealt with information technology use in trans-national and trans-cultural contexts. For example, his work on postcolonial computing has tried to unpack how assumptions about technology and knowledge drawn from Western or industrialized nation experiences create shape (or misshape) technology design. In the process, he has worked with indigenous Australian people, Chinese gamers, mobility between Thailand and the US, and Indian people regarding IT design. Dourish and his team were drawn by these new settings to dismiss the presumption that "everyone is or wants to be just like us". The new experience also helped to challenge current technological practices by showing the assumptions made in familiar settings.

Dourish is interested and intrigued by opportunities presented through design as potential means of ethnographic engagement. He combines social theory, empirical examination, and technology design with varying emphasis throughout his projects.

Publications 

Dourish has published three books. He published "Where the Action Is: The Foundations of Embodied Interaction" (MIT Press) in 2001. This book explores the relationship between phenomenological sociology
and interaction design, particularly with reference to physically embodied computation and ubiquitous computing.
He proposes Tangible computing and Social computing as two different aspects of the same program of investigation, named embodiment.

His second book, "Divining a Digital Future: Mess and Mythology in Ubiquitous Computing," written in collaboration with Genevieve Bell, is an exploration of the social and cultural aspects of ubiquitous computing, with a particular focus on the disciplinary and methodological issues that have shaped the ubiquitous computing research agenda. It was published by MIT Press in 2011.

His third book, "The Stuff of Bits: An Essay on the Materialities of Information," explores the "material arrangements” of various digital objects—that is, how information is represented and interpreted. Through a series of case studies, featuring digital artifacts and practices such as emulation, spreadsheets, databases, and computer networks, he connects the representation of information to broader issues of human experience, touching on “questions of power, policy, and polity in the realm of the digital." The book was published by MIT Press in 2017.

In addition to the three books, he has published conference proceedings, journal papers, conference papers, book chapters, technical reports, essay & position papers, editorial activities, and patents. A full list of his publications can be found at Paul Dourish. Many of the patents that he holds involve document management.

Teaching 

Paul Dourish is a professor of informatics, computer science, and anthropology at UC Irvine. Some classes Dourish teaches are Ubiquitous Computing and Interaction, Social Analysis of Computerization, and Human-Computer Interaction. His Ubiquitous Computing and Interaction class focuses on how humans obtain information and interact using computers. Dourish's Socian Analysis of Computerization class focuses on how the internet, information, and technology affect our everyday lives. Finally, Dourish's Research in Computer-Human Interaction class examines the interactions between users and their devices and can be applied to either a person theoretically studying the field to write a dissertation or to a student wanting to apply these ideas to their own products.

See also
 Lucy Suchman
 Terry Winograd
 Mark Weiser
 Bonnie Nardi
 Genevieve Bell
 Béatrice Galinon-Mélénec
 Critical technical practice

Selected bibliography
 Dourish, P. 2001. Where the Action Is: The Foundations of Embodied Interaction. Cambridge: MIT Press.
 Dourish, P. 2004. What We Talk About When We Talk About Context. Personal and Ubiquitous Computing, 8(1), 19–30.
 Dourish, P. and Anderson, K. 2006. Collective Information Practice: Exploring Privacy and Security as Social and Cultural Phenomena. Human-Computer Interaction, 21(3), 319–342.

References

External links
 Dourish's UC personal home page
 LUCI The Laboratory for Ubiquitous Computing and Interaction
 Dourish's personal website
 Dourish's awards
 Dourish's UC Irvine faculty information

1966 births
Living people
American computer scientists
Scottish computer scientists
British computer scientists
Human–computer interaction researchers
University of California, Irvine faculty
Ubiquitous computing researchers
People educated at St Aloysius' College, Glasgow
Scientists from Glasgow
Fellows of the Association for Computing Machinery
Alumni of the University of Edinburgh
Scientists at PARC (company)